Johan Alcén (born 11 March 1988) is a Swedish former professional ice hockey centre (previously a winger) who played with Brynäs IF and Rögle BK in the Swedish Hockey League (SHL).

Playing career
Alcén was drafted by the Colorado Avalanche in the seventh round of the 2007 NHL Entry Draft, 195th overall. He was drafted from Swedish club, Brynäs IF, where he spent time between the J20 SuperElit and the Elitserien. Alcén played with Brynäs for another two seasons, however, after recording only 2 points in 50 games in 2008–09 he signed with Rögle BK on 16 April 2009.

In the 2009–10 season, Johan was again unable to replicate his J20 performances in the SEL as he posted a modest 8 points in 47 games as Rögle succumbed to relegation to the second tier, HockeyAllsvenskan.

On 5 May 2010, Alcén signed a two-year contract with fellow Allsvenskan team, Leksands IF. After one season with Leksands, Alcén was released to join Mora IK on 11 September 2011. Alcén recorded a professional high of 25 points during the 2011–12 season and was rewarded with a two-year contract extension to remain with Mora on 16 April 2012.

After four seasons with Mora, Alcén made a return to the SHL in signing for a second stint with Brynäs IF on 20 August 2015.

On 22 June 2021, after 15 seasons, Alcén announced his retirement from professional hockey, remaining within the Brynäs IF organization as a sports manager.

Career statistics

Regular season and playoffs

International

References

External links
 

1988 births
Living people
Brynäs IF players
Colorado Avalanche draft picks
IFK Arboga IK players
Leksands IF players
Mora IK players
Rögle BK players
Swedish ice hockey centres